There are three 2011 All-Pro Teams—one each named by the Associated Press (AP), Pro Football Writers Association (PFWA), and Sporting News—for performance in the 2011 NFL season. While none of these have the official imprimatur of the NFL (whose official recognition is nomination to the 2012 Pro Bowl), they are included (separately) in the NFL Record and Fact Book. Any player selected to any of the teams can be described as an "All-Pro."

The AP team, with first- and second-team selections, was chosen by a national panel of 50 NFL writers; the Sporting News selection process uses a panel of 50 NFL coaches and executives, while the PFWA team is chosen by polling its 300+ members.

Teams

Key
 AP = Associated Press first-team All-Pro
 AP-t = Tied for first-team All-Pro in the AP vote
 AP-2 = Associated Press second-team All-Pro
 AP-2t = Tied for second-team All-Pro in the AP vote
 PFWA = Pro Football Writers Association All-NFL
 SN = Sporting News All-Pro

References 

2011 NFL All-Pro Team Voting - News-Leader.com
  Sporting News 2011 NFL awards: All-Pro team

All-Pro Teams
Allpro